The men's javelin throw event at the 2014 World Junior Championships in Athletics was held in Eugene, Oregon, USA, at Hayward Field on 25 and 27 July.

Medalists

Results

Final
27 July
Start time: 15:24  Temperature: 28 °C  Humidity: 37 %
End time: 16:29  Temperature: 29 °C  Humidity: 35 %

Qualifications
25 July
With qualifying standard of 72.00 (Q) or at least the 12 best performers (q) advance to the Final

Summary

Details
With qualifying standard of 72.00 (Q) or at least the 12 best performers (q) advance to the Final

Group A
27 July
Start time; 12:35  Temperature: 22 °C  Humidity: 50 %
End time: 13:16  Temperature: 24 °C  Humidity: 41 %

Group B
27 July
Start time; 13:53  Temperature: 24 °C  Humidity: 41 %
End time: 14:36  Temperature: 26 °C  Humidity: 37 %

Participation
According to an unofficial count, 31 athletes from 27 countries participated in the event.

References

Javelin throw
Javelin throw at the World Athletics U20 Championships